Por river is a minor river in Gadchiroli district of Maharashtra.  It is a minor tributary of Wainganga river and falls into it near Chamorshi.

References

Rivers of Maharashtra
Gadchiroli district
Rivers of India